= The Adventures of Peter Rabbit & Benjamin Bunny =

1996 video game

- Developer: Mindscape
- Publisher: Mindscape
- Platforms: Macintosh, Windows
- Release: 1996

The Adventures of Peter Rabbit & Benjamin Bunny is a 1996 interactive children's storybook video game developed and published by Mindscape for Windows and Macintosh in association with Beatrix Potter publisher Frederick Warne & Co.

The game encourage play through interactive hotspots. It is for ages 3-7.

== Reception ==
CNET said "A coloring book and crayons are included in the box with the CD-ROM, but the format is small, and the drawings are too detailed for young children"

Coming Soon Magazine deemed it one of the best interactive storybooks ever made. PC Mag felt it offered a "wonderful introduction" to the Peter Rabbit universe. Standard Speaker noted that everything is "faithfully transferred" from the source material.
